Bandhan may refer to:

Film
 Bandhan (1940 film), an Indian Bollywood film directed by N.R. Acharya
 Bandhan (1956 film), a Hindi drama film starring Meena Kumari
 Bandhan (1969 film), a Hindi drama film starring Rajesh Khanna and Mumtaz
 Bandhan (1991 film), a Marathi film
 Bandhan (1998 film), a Bollywood drama/action film starring Salman Khan, Rambha and Jackie Shroff
  Bandhan, a 2003 Assamese film
 Bandhan (2004 film), a Bengali film starring Jee, Koyel Mullick, Victor Banerjee directed by Rabi Kinagi

Television
 Bandhan (2000 TV series), a Hindi Drama series produced by Balaji Telefilms
 Bandhan (Indian TV series), a Hindi Zee TV production
 Bandhan (Pakistani TV series), an Urdu language PTV production

Other uses
 Bandhan Bank, an Indian banking and financial services company
 Bandhan, Vikramgad, a village in the Palghar district of Maharashtra, India

See also
 Bandham (disambiguation)